Hot FM, stylised as hot fm, is a Malaysian radio station owned by Synchrosound Studio Sdn Bhd, a subsidiary of Media Prima. Broadcasts transmitted from Sri Pentas in Bandar Utama. The station operates 24 hours a day; broadcasting a mixed selections of songs in Malay, Indonesian and English; though Malay is the major language used.

In addition to the radio broadcasting, Hot FM also simulcast the programming on television, the first one is on 8TV from 2006 until 2016 where it broadcast HOT FM AM Krew and features interactive SMS chatbox during the program. Now, Hot FM broadcast simultaneously on On May 4, 2021, Hot FM will broadcast simultaneously on TV3 every Monday to Friday from 1:30 am – 2:30 am until 1 September 2022. Also broadcast simultaneously on NTV7 every day from 12:00 midnight - 7:00 am starting April 4, 2022.

History 

Hot FM previously operated as WOW FM, then WaFM, which was owned by producer and actor Tiara Jacquelina. Media Prima acquired the station  not long after and began test transmissions from 15 January 2006 to 6 February 2006, in which the station officially commenced operations led by Sathiaseelan a/l Paul Thurai, who was a former presenter with Era FM.

In 2009, Hot FM went down in history as for the first time it was charted at the top among other radio stations in Malaysia with 3.8 million weekly listeners, ahead of its traditional rival Era FM which only reached 3.76 million listeners in a week.

On 29 November 2021, the frequency of Hot FM in Kota Bharu, Kelantan transmitted from Peringat has been changed from 105.1 MHz to 88.6 MHz and replace Buletin FM which has ended its broadcast.

On March 28, 2022, Hot FM will no longer broadcast temporarily through the MYTV platform.

On June 1, 2022, Hot FM will begin playing Malay songs from the 90s every hour, effectively changed the radio format to hot adult contemporary radio station.

Notable announcers 
 Khairy Jamaluddin (from 15 February 2023)
 AG Azmeer (returned as of July 2021; previously as a Hot FM presenter from 2006 to 2016 and Kool FM presenter from 2016 to 2021)
 Fara Fauzana (returned as of July 2021)
 Johan (joined Hot FM as of August 2022, previously as an Era FM presenter from 2011 to 2022)
 Ayu Mansor (joined Hot FM as of January 2022, also as the champion of Hot FM Radio Star)
 Fizi Ali (joined Hot FM as of August 2022, previously as an Ultra FM presenter from 2015 to 2016 and Suria FM presenter from 2016 to July 2022)
 Imran Aqil (joined Hot FM as of August 2021)
 Aisha Mazlin (joined from Contest Fizi Cari jodoh 2023)

Frequency

TV Channels

Current channels
 NTV7

Former channels
 TV3
 8TV

References

External links 
 

2006 establishments in Malaysia
Radio stations in Malaysia
Radio stations established in 2006
Mass media in Petaling Jaya
Malay-language radio stations
Media Prima